Juan José Olalla Fernández (born 13 January 1980) is a former Spanish professional footballer who played as a defender.

Career
Born in Madrid, Olalla finished his youth career with Real Madrid CF, making his senior debut in the 2000–01 season with the reserves in Segunda División B. On 6 November 2002, he made his main-squad and Copa del Rey debut, coming on as a substitute of Santiago Solari in a 4–0 away win against Real Oviedo. He was choiced from Real Madrid B by Carlos Queiroz for main team 2003–04 Champions League campaign, but did not play a single match in this tournament. On 2004-05 season, Olalla was loaned to UE Lleida of the second division. Olalla made his Segunda División debut on 27 February 2005 as a starting central defender against Polideportivo Ejido.

Since the 2005-06 season Olalla played at a third level of Spanish football system and below. His last team was CU Collado Villalba, for which he played in the 2020-21 season.

References

External links

Juanjo Olalla at playmakerstats.com (English version of ceroacero.es)
FutMadrid profile (in Spanish)

1980 births
Living people
People from Madrid
Spanish footballers
Footballers from Madrid
Association football defenders
Segunda División players
Segunda División B players
Tercera División players